Calétric or Colétric of Chartres was a 6th-century French bishop and saint. His name is also spelled Caletricus, Chaletricus or Chalactericus (in Venantius Fortunatus), whilst in French it also appears in the popular forms Caltry or Calais, probably by confusion with the abbot-saint of Le Maine. His feast day is on 4 September.

His predecessor as bishop of Chartres was Lubin of Chartres, who is last definitively mentioned in 551. Caletric definitely died before 573, the year when his successor Pappolus took part in a council in Paris. However, as that council was called by Sigebert I on splitting the diocese of Chartres, Calétric probably died shortly before it. According to Fortunatus he died aged only 38. 

Calétric himself is only contemporaneously known from his attendance at two other councils - one in Paris sometime between 557 and 563 and the other in Tours in 567/568. He also appeared in a 9th century Life of Saint Lubin, which stated that he was once a young priest of noble birth with a sister called Mallegonde.

References

Bishops of Chartres
6th-century Frankish bishops